The .500 Linebaugh is a .50 caliber handgun cartridge designed for use in revolvers. It is considered one of the most powerful handgun cartridges designed in terms of kinetic energy and  power factor (momentum).

History
The .500 Linebaugh cartridge was designed by John Linebaugh of Maryville, Missouri, in 1986. John Linebaugh had been converting .45 Colt six-shooters to five-shot revolvers, thus offering a stronger cylinder which could withstand the firing of higher-pressure .45 Colt ammunition. While this venture was successful, he continued to search for a more powerful cartridge, which resulted in the .500 Linebaugh.

The first revolvers converted to use the .500 Linebaugh were the Ruger Bisley and the Seville revolvers. Due to the demise of the Seville revolvers in the early 1990s, all subsequent conversions have been carried out on revolvers based on the Ruger Bisley frame.

It was when the supply of .348 Winchester cases started running out that John Linebaugh began working on the .475 Linebaugh, which could be formed from the more available .45-70 Government cases. When the Winchester Model 71 was reintroduced in the .348 Winchester, the ability to form .500 Linebaugh cases became again feasible. Today, Starline and Buffalo Bore offer .500 Linebaugh cases which are not dependent on the supply of .348 Winchester cases.

Cartridge design and specifications
The .500 Linebaugh is a proprietary cartridge and thus has not been adopted by mainline firearms manufacturers. Currently the only firearm manufacturer that produces a revolver for this cartridge is Magnum Research (owned by Kahr Firearms Group), in the BFR product line. Prior to January 2019, the only alternative was to have a gunsmith such as John Linebaugh of Linebaugh Custom Six guns or Hamilton Bowen of Bowen Classic Arms convert pre-existing revolvers such as the Ruger Blackhawk and Bisley to fire the cartridge.   Bowen is known to have converted the Ruger Redhawk double-action revolver for use with this cartridge.

Due to the proprietary status of the cartridge neither the CIP nor SAAMI have published official specifications for the cartridge. As is the case, there can be some variations from gunsmith to gunsmith.

The cartridge uses .510 in (12.95 mm) diameter jacketed bullets or .511-.512 in (12.98-13.01 mm) lead bullets.

Sporting usage
The .500 Linebaugh was designed as a hunting cartridge. This particular loading generates  of energy making this one of the most powerful handgun cartridges put into production. In terms of energy, this is comparable to the .454 Casull cartridge. However, the .500 Linebaugh provides a larger diameter, heavier bullet with a greater sectional density than the .454 Casull. As a hunting cartridge it is capable of taking any North American game animals and most African game species.

See also
 .50 Action Express
 .50 GI
 .500 S&W Magnum

Notes

External links
 

Pistol and rifle cartridges